Eta Pavonis, a name latinized from η Pavonis, is a single star in the southern constellation of Pavo, positioned near the western constellation border next to Ara. It has an orange hue and is visible to the naked eye with an apparent visual magnitude of 3.61. It has an absolute magnitude of −1.56, and is drifting closer with a radial velocity of −7.6 km/s.

This is an evolved bright giant star with a stellar classification K2II, between the classifications of giant and supergiant. Having exhausted the supply of hydrogen at its core, it has expanded to around 33.5 times the radius of the Sun. The star is radiating 469 times the luminosity of the Sun from its enlarged photosphere at an effective temperature of 4,642 K.

References

K-type bright giants
Pavo (constellation)
Pavonis, Eta
Durchmusterung objects
160635
086929
6582